O with tilde (О̃ о̃; italics: О̃ о̃) is a letter of the Cyrillic script. In all its forms it looks exactly like the Latin letter O with tilde (Õ õ Õ õ).

O with tilde is used in the Khinalug language where it represents a nasalized close-mid back rounded vowel .

See also
Õ õ : Latin letter Õ - an Estonian and Silesian letter
Cyrillic characters in Unicode

References

Cyrillic letters with diacritics
Letters with tilde